The Birmingham Edgbaston by-election was held on 2 July 1953.  It was held when the incumbent Conservative MP, Peter Bennett was elevated to a hereditary peerage.  It was won by the Conservative candidate Edith Pitt.

References

Edgbbaston
Birmingham Edgbaston by-election
Birmingham Edgbaston by-election
1950s in Birmingham, West Midlands
Birmingham Edgbaston by-election